"Se Me Sigue Olvidando" is a ballad written and produced by Rudy Pérez and performed by Puerto Rican-American singer-songwriter José Feliciano on his studio album Te Amaré (1986). The song reached number six on the Billboard Hot Latin Songs chart.

Marc Anthony version

Puerto Rican-American salsa singer-songwriter Marc Anthony covered "Se Me Sigue Olvidando" on his second studio album Todo a Su Tiempo (1995). Billboard critic John Lannert cited "Se Me Sigue Olvidando" and "Nadie Como Ella" as one of the albums "upbeat entries". Anthony's version was recognized as one of the best-performing songs of the year at the 1996 ASCAP Latin Awards.

Charts

Weekly charts

Year-end charts

See also
List of Billboard Tropical Airplay number ones of 1994 and 1995

References

1986 songs
1986 singles
1995 singles
José Feliciano songs
Marc Anthony songs
1980s ballads
RCA Records singles
RMM Records singles
Spanish-language songs
Songs written by Rudy Pérez
Song recordings produced by Rudy Pérez
Song recordings produced by Sergio George